Maurice Lennon "Dick" Burrus (born January 29, 1898, in Hatteras, North Carolina died February 2, 1972, in Elizabeth City, North Carolina) was a professional baseball player.

Early years
Burrus was born in North Carolina's Outer Banks, where his family had lived for generations, to sea captain Dozier Burrus and Achsah Williams.   When he was eleven, the family moved to Elizabeth City so that he could further his education. It was at Elizabeth City High School that Burrus was first introduced to baseball, playing pitcher and catcher for the school team.  On the recommendation of one of his teachers, Burrus finished his high school education at Oak Ridge Academy, where he was eventually named to the school's All-Time Baseball Hall of Fame.

Upon his graduation from the academy, Burrus studied textile engineering at North Carolina State College. His education was partially funded by athletic scholarships, with the remainder paid from the proceeds of his summer and weekend jobs in construction and at the local iron works and dry docks. Burrus interrupted his education for two years to join the United States Army, serving at Camp Gordon in Georgia. He returned to NC State to letter in three sports.

Baseball career
In 1919, Burrus left college to begin his professional baseball career.  He joined the minor league South Atlantic League as a first baseman for the Columbia Comers, and was paid $3000. Two months later, he was signed by Connie Mack to play for the Philadelphia Athletics. Because of inconsistent fielding, Burrus was sent to Columbus in the American Association, before being sold to Atlanta, where he helped win the Southern Association pennant.

In 1925, Burrus returned to the majors, playing for the Boston Braves. That season he batted .340 with 200 hits, 41 doubles and 87 RBIs, all career-bests. He also led all National League first basemen in fielding with a .990 percentage in 151 games.

Later that year, Burrus suffered a hernia and was never able to play at the same level. His contract was sold to the Indianapolis Indians for $10,000. He helped that team win the AA pennant. He later played for the Houston Buffaloes, and in 1930 was released for good by Atlanta.

During his best years, his salary only reached as high as $9000.

Post-baseball
After his baseball career ended, Burrus returned to his native North Carolina. He served as a county commissioner, and worked as a fish buyer and Texaco distributor until his retirement in 1962. He then moved to Currituck County, North Carolina to live near a hospital.

Burrus died of lung cancer in 1972, leaving behind his widow and four children, including daughters Dixie and Mary, and nine grandchildren.

Sources
Interview with Maurice Burrus and biography

1898 births
1972 deaths
People from Dare County, North Carolina
Baseball players from North Carolina
Boston Braves players
Philadelphia Athletics players
Major League Baseball first basemen
NC State Wolfpack baseball players
Deaths from lung cancer
People from Elizabeth City, North Carolina